Cassidy Erin Gifford (born August 2, 1993) is an American model and actress. She is the daughter of former American football player Frank Gifford and American television host Kathie Lee Gifford.

In 2015, she was chosen as one of Esquire magazine's "18 Beautiful Women America Won't Be Able to Resist This Summer."

Personal life
She is the younger sister of Cody Gifford, and younger half-sister of Kyle Gifford, Jeff Gifford, and Vicky Gifford-Kennedy from her father's first marriage. In June 2020, she married Ben Wierda, nephew of Betsy DeVos and Erik Prince and grandson of Edgar Prince, in a private ceremony in Michigan.

Filmography

Film

Television

References

External links

1993 births
Actresses from New York City
American film actresses
American child actresses
American stage actresses
American television actresses
Living people
21st-century American women